The monotonicity criterion is a voting system criterion used to evaluate both single and multiple winner ranked voting systems. A ranked voting system is monotonic if it is neither possible to prevent the election of a candidate by ranking them higher on some of the ballots, nor possible to elect an otherwise unelected candidate by ranking them lower on some of the ballots (while nothing else is altered on any ballot). That is to say, in single winner elections no winner is harmed by up-ranking and no loser is helped by down-ranking. Douglas Woodall called the criterion mono-raise.

Raising a candidate  on some ballots while changing the orders of other candidates does not constitute a failure of monotonicity.

The monotonicity criterion renders the intuition that there should be neither need to worry about harming a candidate by (nothing else than) up-ranking nor it should be possible to support a candidate by (nothing else than) counter-intuitively down-ranking. There are several variations of that criterion; e.g., what Douglas R. Woodall called mono-add-plump: A candidate  should not be harmed if further ballots are added that have  top with no second choice.  

Of the single-winner ranked voting systems, Borda, Schulze, ranked pairs, maximize affirmed majorities, descending solid coalitions, and descending acquiescing coalitions are monotonic, while Coombs' method, runoff voting, and instant-runoff voting (IRV) are not. The multi-winner single transferable vote (STV) system is also non-monotonic.

While Woodall articulated monotonicity in the context of ordinal voting systems, the property can be generalized to cardinal voting and plurality voting systems by evaluating whether reducing or removing support for a candidate can help that candidate win an election. In this context, first past the post, approval voting, range voting, STAR Voting, majority judgment, as well as the multiple-winner systems single non-transferable vote, plurality-at-large voting (multiple non-transferable vote, bloc voting), Proportional approval voting, Sequential proportional approval voting, Reweighted range voting and cumulative voting are monotonic. Party-list proportional representation using D'Hondt, Sainte-Laguë or the largest remainder method is monotonic in the same sense.

Instant-runoff voting and the two-round system are not monotonic

Using an example that applies to instant-runoff voting (IRV) and to the two-round system, it is shown that these voting systems violate the mono-raise criterion.
Suppose a president were being elected among three candidates, a left, a right, and a center candidate, and 100 votes cast. The number of votes for an absolute majority is therefore 51.

Suppose the votes are cast as follows:

According to the 1st preferences, Left finishes first with 35 votes, Right gets 33 votes, and Center 32 votes, thus all candidates lack an absolute majority of first preferences.
In an actual runoff between the top two candidates, Left would win against Right with 30+5+16=51 votes. The same happens (in this example) under IRV, Center gets eliminated, and Left wins against Right with 51 to 49 votes.

But if at least two of the five voters who ranked Right first, and Left second, would raise Left, and vote 1st Left, 2nd Right; then Right would be defeated by these votes in favor of Center.
Let's assume that two voters change their preferences in that way, which changes two rows of the table:

Now Left gets 37 first preferences, Right receives 31 first preferences, and Center still receives 32 first preferences, and there is again no candidate with an absolute majority of first preferences.
But now Right is eliminated, and Center remains in round 2 of IRV (or the actual runoff in the Two-round system). And Center beats its opponent Left with a remarkable majority of 60 to 40 votes.

Estimated likelihood of IRV lacking monotonicity

Crispin Allard argued, based on a mathematical model of London voters that the probability of monotonicity failure actually changing the result of an STV multi-winner election for any given constituency would be 1 in 4000, however Warren D. Smith claims that this paper contains 2 computation errors and omits a type of nonmonotonicity, making Allard's result "1000 times smaller than the truth".

Another result, using the (unrealistic) "impartial culture" probability model, yields about 15% probability in elections with 3 candidates.  As the number of candidates increases, these probabilities tend to increase eventually toward 100% (in some models this limit has been proven, in others it is only conjectured). Other Monte Carlo experiments found probabilities of 5.7% for an IAC model, and 6.9% for a uniformly-distributed 1D political spectrum model.

Nicholas Miller also disputed Allard's conclusion and provided a different mathematical model for the three-candidate case.

A 2013 study using a 2D spatial model with various voter distributions found that IRV was non-monotonic in at least 15% of competitive elections, increasing with number of candidates.  The authors conclude that "three-way competitive races will exhibit unacceptably frequent monotonicity failures" and "In light of these results, those seeking to implement a fairer multi-candidate election system should be wary of adopting IRV."

Real-life monotonicity violations

If the ballots of a real election are released, it is fairly easy to prove if
 election of a candidate could have been circumvented by raising them on some of the ballots, or
 election of an otherwise unelected candidate by lowering them on some of the ballots

would have been possible (nothing else is altered on any ballot). Both events can be considered as real-life monotonicity violations.

However, the ballots (or information allowing them to be reconstructed) are rarely released for ranked voting elections, which means there are few recorded monotonicity violations for real elections.

2009 Burlington, Vermont mayoral election

A monotonicity violation could have occurred in the 2009 Burlington, Vermont mayor election under instant-runoff voting (IRV), where the necessary information is available. In this election, the winner Bob Kiss could have been defeated by raising him on some of the ballots. For example, if all voters who ranked Republican Kurt Wright over Progressive Bob Kiss over Democrat Andy Montroll, would have ranked Kiss over Wright over Montroll, and additionally some people who ranked Wright but not Kiss or Montroll, would have ranked Kiss over Wright, then these votes in favor of Kiss would have defeated him. The winner in this scenario would have been Andy Montroll, who was also the Condorcet winner according to the original ballots, i.e. for any other running candidate, a majority ranked Montroll above the competitor. This hypothetical monotonicity violating scenario, however, would require that right-leaning voters switch to the most left-wing candidate.

Australian elections and by-elections

Since every or almost every IRV election in Australia has been conducted in the black (i.e. not releasing enough information to reconstruct the ballots), non-monotonicity is difficult to detect in Australia.

However, the theoretical disadvantage of non-monotonicity can be seen in the 2009 Frome state by-election. The by-election was a contest between the Liberal Party of Australia, Australian Labor Party, independent candidate Geoff Brock, and the National Party of Australia. The eventual winner was Brock, who placed only third on first preferences with about 24% of the vote. However, he was favoured by National Party voters, whose preferences placed him ahead of the Labor candidate by 31 votes. Labor was pushed to third place and eliminated in the next count, with most of their preferences flowing to Brock, allowing him to defeat the Liberal candidate. However, if a number of voters who preferred Liberal had given their first preference to Labor, Brock would have been eliminated in the penultimate count. The final count would have been between the Liberal and Labor candidates, allowing the former to win. For this to happen, between 31 and 321 Liberal voters would have needed to instead vote Labor. This is classic monotonicity violation: a number of Liberal voters unintentionally hurt their most preferred candidate.

See also 
Voting system
Voting system criterion
Monotone preferences in consumer theory.
Monotonicity (mechanism design)
Maskin monotonicity

References 

Electoral system criteria